Zinc ferrites are a series of synthetic inorganic compounds of zinc and iron (ferrite) with the general formula of ZnxFe3−xO4.  Zinc ferrite compounds can be prepared by aging solutions of Zn(NO3)2, Fe(NO3)3, and triethanolamine in the presence and in the absence of hydrazine, or reacting iron oxides and zinc oxide at high temperature. Spinel (Zn, Fe) Fe2O4 appears as a tan-colored solid that is insoluble in water, acids, or diluted alkali.  Because of their high opacity, zinc ferrites can be used as pigments, especially in applications requiring heat stability. For example, zinc ferrite prepared from yellow iron oxide can be used as a substitute for applications in temperatures above . When added to high corrosion-resistant coatings, the corrosion protection increases with an increase in the concentration of zinc ferrite. A recent investigation shows that the zinc ferrite, which is paramagnetic in the bulk form, becomes ferrimagnetic in nanocrystalline thin film format. A large room temperature magnetization and narrow ferromagnetic resonance linewidth have been achieved by controlling thin films growth conditions.

See also
 Ferrite core
 Ferrite (magnet)
 Zinc smelting

References

External links
 
 

ferrite
Spinel group
Ferrites